Baker's Drive-Thru is a chain of fast-food restaurants located in the Inland Empire region of Southern California. The menu features a selection of items such as hamburgers, french fries, tacos, burritos, quesadillas, and milkshakes.

Inspired by the success of McDonald's, Neal Baker founded his first restaurant in 1952, calling it "Baker's Burgers." Three years later, Baker added Mexican food to the menu. Burgers were sold at one window and Mexican food at another; he called this the "Twin Kitchen" concept. After struggling for over 30 years to make Bakers a success, Baker hired Joe Amlani in 1986 to conduct a complete overhaul on the concept and establish their operations as they exist today. Shortly after Carol Bakers passing in 2017 Amlani was let go while under contract. Amlani pursued legal action in San Bernardino County Superior Court. After the Baker children took over they appointed Jason Talley as their new CEO, nephew of Neil and Carol Baker son in law Terry Talley. Jason tried adamantly to not pay Amlani what he was owed on his contract and tried to invoke ERISA preemption in Federal Court. That motion was brought to Central District in California in early 2018. Bakers motion was denied and they were sent back to Superior Court of San Bernardino. After months of delays the courts finally settled the case and sided with Amlani.

In 1995, it began adding a vegetarian menu to locations, originally called the Loma Linda Kitchen menu due to the prevalence of vegetarians in Loma Linda; Seventh-day Adventists, who are traditionally vegetarian, comprise about half the population of the city of Loma Linda. The first two locations that featured this menu were in Loma Linda and Yucaipa. As of February 2013, the vegetarian menu has been added to 21 locations.

See also
 List of hamburger restaurants

References

External links
Official website

Fast-food chains of the United States
Mexican restaurants in the United States
Restaurants in California
Fast-food hamburger restaurants
Restaurants established in 1952
Companies based in San Bernardino County, California
1952 establishments in California